The Battle of Sokolovo took place on 8 and 9 March 1943, near the village of Sokolovo (Sokolove) near Kharkiv in Ukraine when the ongoing attack of the  was delayed by joint Soviet and Czechoslovak forces. It was the first time that a foreign military unit, the First Czechoslovak Independent Field Battalion, fought together with the Red Army. Under the command of Ludvík Svoboda, later President of Czechoslovakia, the Czechoslovak soldiers delayed the advance of Germans to the Mzha River. On 13 March the position was abandoned as untenable due to the complete German encirclement of Kharkov.

Aftermath 
The Soviet supreme command highly valued both the bravery of the Czechoslovak soldiers, the political significance of the fact that the Soviet people were no longer alone in their struggle against Germany. First Lieutenant Otakar Jaroš, the commander of the 1st company (who was killed in the course of the battle and posthumously promoted to captain) was the first foreign citizen ever to be awarded the highest Soviet military order, the Hero of the Soviet Union. Moreover, one of the local schools in Sokolovo was named in his honor.

The initial personnel of the Czechoslovak army was heavily composed of Jewish refugees, but after the liberation of Ukraine many Volhynian Czechs were drafted into the army, leading to an increase in antisemitism. Svoboda attempted to counter this with an antisemitic show trial of Maxmilian Holzer, who was blamed for the defeat at Sokolovo, at which Svoboda served as the main witness. Holzer was sentenced to death but "volunteered" to a penal unit, to which he was reportedly sent with a note that he not return alive. At a 1963 press conference, Svoboda claimed that this incident occurred because of a misunderstanding.

In popular culture

The Battle of Sokolovo was widely celebrated under the post-war communist regime in Czechoslovakia as an example of Soviet-Czechoslovak comradeship. The town of Falkenau an der Eger in Karlovy Vary Region was renamed Sokolov in 1948 after the expulsion of Germans from Czechoslovakia. A prominent street in Prague was renamed Sokolovská street and a mosaic depicting the battle in the socialist realism style was inaugurated in the Florenc metro station in the city.

The battle became the subject matter of a 1974 Czechoslovak film with the same name, directed by Otakar Vávra.

See also
Marie Ljalková, Czech sniper who became famous for her actions at Sokolovo.

References 

 Fidler, Jiří. Sokolovo 1943 – malý encyklopedický slovník. Praha: Naše vojsko, 2003. . (in Czech)

External links 
 Battle map 8 to 13 March 1943
 A battle twice misused (PDF in Czech)
 Ludvik Svoboda webpage in Czech
 Czechoslovak military units in the USSR (1942-1945) 

1943 in the Soviet Union
Battles and operations of the Soviet–German War
Conflicts in 1943
Battles and operations of World War II involving Czechoslovakia
Czechoslovakia–Soviet Union relations
Battles of World War II involving Germany
March 1943 events